"Theme for a Dream" is a song by Cliff Richard and the Shadows, released as a single in February 1961. It peaked at number 3 on the UK Singles Chart and also received a silver disc for 250,000 sales.

Release and reception
"Theme for a Dream" was the first song by Richard to feature a female chorus, sung by the Mike Sammes Singers. When Richard and the Shadows got the song they "liked it, but it wasn't really us …  but we did it because we felt it was a change of direction as far as we were concerned".

The single exceeded 200,000 advance sales in the UK. However, in Spain, it was banned because of its supposedly suggestive lyrics due to the Francoist censorship.

The B-side, "Mumblin' Mosie", was written and originally recorded by American Johnny Otis in 1960 and had been a minor hit for him on the Billboard Hot 100. Richard had previously recorded another of Otis' songs, "Willie and the Hand Jive", which he had released as the B-side to "Fall in Love with You".

Richard also recorded a German-language version of "Theme for a Dream", titled "Schön wie ein Traum", in April 1961 with backing vocals by the Hansen Girls. It was released as a single in Germany in June 1961 with the B-side "Vreneli", which was an original German song.

Reviewing for Disc, Don Nicholl described "Theme for a Dream" as an "attractive tune and lyric married very well indeed. Gets into your head right from the start".

The melody of the track "Pal Pal.... Har Pal" from the 2006 Bollywood film Lage Raho Munna Bhai was lifted from "Theme for a Dream"

Track listing
7": Columbia / DB 4593
 "Theme for a Dream" – 2:06
 "Mumblin' Mosie" – 2:17

7": Columbia / C 21 843 (Germany)
 "Schön wie ein Traum" – 2:05
 "Vreneli" – 2:39

Personnel
 Cliff Richard – vocals
 Hank Marvin – lead guitar
 Bruce Welch – rhythm guitar
 Jet Harris – bass guitar
 Tony Meehan – drums
 Mike Sammes Singers – backing vocals

Charts

German-language version
"Schön wie ein Traum"

"Vreneli"

References

Songs about dreams
1961 singles
1961 songs
Cliff Richard songs
Songs written by Mort Garson
Columbia Graphophone Company singles
Song recordings produced by Norrie Paramor